Rev. Père Luc Marie Lacroix of Canada (1909–1991) was a Dominican Catholic priest who served as the Treasurer of the Association des Scouts du Rwanda.

Lacroix was a publisher and author of books on Scouting for the  Association des Scouts du Canada, of which he was the curator.

In 1983, he was awarded the 163rd Bronze Wolf, the only distinction of the World Organization of the Scout Movement, awarded by the World Scout Committee for exceptional services to world Scouting, on the occasion of the 15th World Scout Jamboree.

References

External links

 

Recipients of the Bronze Wolf Award
1909 births
1991 deaths
Scouting and Guiding in Canada